Grand Hotel Sofia is a five-star hotel in the center of Sofia, Bulgaria, located on Gen. Joseph C. Street in Sredets district. It is located near the Bulgarian National Theatre and the City Art Gallery, in walking distance from Bulgaria Concert Hall, the Alexander Nevsky Cathedral and the Vasil Levski National Stadium. The hotel has a notable collection of over 400 original oil paintings.

Set in a modern marble-glass building, the hotel has 109 rooms, 13 luxurious apartments, a gym with sauna, solarium, jacuzzi and massage, and a restaurant. Between 2005 and 2007, the hotel hosted the annual chess tournament, the M-Tel Masters.

References

External links
Official site

Hotels in Sofia